This is a list of instruments by Hornbostel-Sachs number, covering those instruments that are classified under 32 under that system. This category includes all string instruments in which the resonator cannot be removed without resulting in the destruction of the instrument, labelled as composite chordophones.

These instruments may be classified with a suffix, based on how the strings are caused to vibrate.

4: Hammers or beaters
5: Bare hands and fingers
6: Plectrum
7: Bowing
71: Using a bow
72: Using a wheel
73: Using a ribbon
8: Keyboard
9: Using a mechanical drive

List

321. Lutes
Balalaikas
Bandura
Banjos
Banjo
Bluegress banjo
Plectrum banjo
Tenor banjo
Bouzoukis
Charangos
Charango
Charangon
Hatun charango
Hualaycho
Ronroco
Đàn đáy
Đàn nguyệt
Đàn tỳ bà
Domras
Cittern
Guitars:
Baritone guitar
Bass guitar
Classical guitar
Electric guitar
Flamenco guitar
Lap Steel guitar
Steel guitar
Hurdy gurdy
Lutes
Archlute
Lute
Theorbo
Kobza
Lyre
Laud
Mandolins
Mandola
Mandolin
Octave mandolin
Mandocello
Mandobass
Nyckelharpa
Pipa
Shamisen/samisen/sangen
Sitar
Torban
Ukuleles
Vina
Viols
 Viola da gamba
Violins
Fiddle
Hardanger fiddle
Vertical viola (and other members of the violin octet family)
Viola
Viola d'amore
Violin
Cello
Double Bass
Zhongruan

322. Harps
Harp
Ancient Greek harp
African harp
Celtic harp
Concert harp

323. Harp lutes
Kora

Undefined
Geomungo/komungo
Khim
Kutiyapi/kutyapi/kutiapi
Sarangi
Vielle
Washtub bass
Xalam (or khalam)

References

32
Composite chordophones